Milandou is a Congolese surname that may refer to:

Anatole Milandou (born 1946), archbishop of the Roman Catholic Archdiocese of Brazzaville
Florent Baloki-Milandou (1971–2007), Congolese footballer

Surnames of Congolese origin
Kongo-language surnames